Idrottsföreningen kamraterna Holmsund is a football club from Holmsund, Sweden, founded on 8 June 1923 that plays its home games at Kamratvallen. They took part in the 1967 Allsvenskan. They folded and were restarted in 1990.

English footballer and actor Vinnie Jones played for the club in 1986.

References

External links
Official website 

 
1923 establishments in Sweden
Football clubs in Västerbotten County
Association football clubs established in 1923